This is a list of notable Canadian pizza chains. This list is limited to pizza chain restaurants that are based in or originated in Canada:

Canadian pizza chains
 241 Pizza - franchise chain headquartered in Scarborough, Toronto
 Boston Pizza - Canadian-based chain that owns and franchises locations in Canada, the United States and Mexico

See also

 Pizza in Canada
 List of Canadian restaurant chains
 List of fast-food chains in Canada
 List of pizza chains
 List of pizza franchises
 Lists of restaurants

Pizza chains, Canada